Touchwood Lake may refer to:

Touchwood Lake (Alberta), Canada
Touchwood Lake (Manitoba), Canada